Sylvain Boris Nabil Deslandes (born 25 April 1997) is a professional footballer who plays as a defender for Debreceni VSC. Born in Cameroon, he has represented France at under-16 through under-20 level.

Career
Deslandes moved upon the expiry of his contract with French club Caen to join English side Wolverhampton Wanderers in July 2015, agreeing a two-year deal (with the option of a third year). He made his club debut on 25 August 2015 in a League Cup win over Barnet.

On 31 January 2017, he joined Bury on loan until the end of the season.
He returned to Wolves at the end of the 2016–17 season having made no appearances for Bury.

He appeared regularly under Nuno Espírito Santo in pre-season before the 2017–18 campaign and played the full 90 minutes of a 2–0 EFL Cup win at Premier League side Southampton. He also came on as a substitute during Wolves' 2–1 Championship victory against Nottingham Forest in September 2017, en route to winning promotion as champions.

On 3 January 2018, he agreed to join Portsmouth on loan until the end of the season where he reunited with former Wolves manager Kenny Jackett. However, he returned to Wolves at the end of the season having made only two appearances there after Jackett had said that Deslandes' future was not at left-back but centre-back as he is a player with "power" and "athleticism".

Deslandes was supposedly loaned out again for the 2019–20 season to Bulgarian side Lokomotiv Plovdiv with fellow Wolves player Jordan Graham on a season-long loan. However, it was announced that both Deslandes' and Graham's loan spells had failed to receive the necessary FIFA clearance in due time.

On 31 January 2020, Deslandes left Wolves permanently to join Romanian club Argeș Pitești.

On 15 July 2021, Deslandes signed a two-year contract with Hungarian club Debreceni VSC containing a possible one-year extension.

Career statistics

Club

References

External links
 
 
 

1997 births
Living people
Cameroonian footballers
French footballers
France youth international footballers
Association football defenders
Championnat National players
Liga II players
English Football League players
Stade Malherbe Caen players
Wolverhampton Wanderers F.C. players
Bury F.C. players
Portsmouth F.C. players
FC Jumilla players
FC Argeș Pitești players
Debreceni VSC players
Cameroonian expatriate footballers
French expatriate footballers
Expatriate footballers in England
Expatriate footballers in Hungary
Cameroonian expatriate sportspeople in England
French expatriate sportspeople in England
Expatriate footballers in Romania
Cameroonian expatriate sportspeople in Romania
French expatriate sportspeople in Romania
Cameroonian expatriate sportspeople in Hungary
French expatriate sportspeople in Hungary
French sportspeople of Cameroonian descent
Nemzeti Bajnokság I players